Maria Consolata Collino (born 9 December 1947) is an Italian fencer. She won a silver medal in the women's individual foil event at the 1976 Summer Olympics.

References

External links
 

1947 births
Living people
Italian female fencers
Olympic fencers of Italy
Fencers at the 1972 Summer Olympics
Fencers at the 1976 Summer Olympics
Olympic silver medalists for Italy
Olympic medalists in fencing
Sportspeople from Turin
Medalists at the 1976 Summer Olympics
20th-century Italian women
21st-century Italian women